Low Pass is an unincorporated community in Lane County, Oregon, United States, on the Long Tom River,  east of Blachly and  west of Cheshire.

The settlement is centered on a small pullout on Oregon Route 36 with a gas station/convenience store and a diner that serves as an unofficial community center for rural residents.

The settlement is named for its location on a slight rise approaching the foothills of the Coast Range mountains, in contrast to the nearby mountain pass High Pass. Much of the land west of Low Pass consists of old-growth forest owned by the Bureau of Land Management.

The community has also been known as "Long Tom Station" after the nearby river; the name "Low Pass" was made official by a United States Board on Geographic Names decision of 1985.

References

Unincorporated communities in Lane County, Oregon
Unincorporated communities in Oregon